The California College of the Arts (CCA) is a private art school in San Francisco, California. It was founded in Berkeley, California in 1907 and moved to a historic estate in Oakland, California in 1922. In 1996, it opened a second campus in San Francisco; in 2022, the Oakland campus was closed and merged into the San Francisco campus. CCA enrolls approximately 1,239 undergraduates and 380 graduate students.

History

CCA was founded in 1907 by Frederick Meyer in Berkeley as the School of the California Guild of Arts and Crafts during the height of the Arts and Crafts movement.  The Arts and Crafts movement originated in Europe during the late 19th century as a response to the industrial aesthetics of the machine age. Followers of the movement advocated an integrated approach to art, design, and craft.

In 1908 the school was renamed California School of Arts and Crafts, and in 1936 it became the California College of Arts and Crafts (CCAC).

The college's Oakland campus location was acquired in 1922, when Meyer bought the four-acre James Treadwell estate at Broadway and College Avenue. Two of its buildings are on the National Register of Historic Places. After the San Francisco campus was opened, the Oakland campus continued to house the more traditional, craft based studios like the art glass, jewelry metal arts, printmaking, painting, sculpture and ceramic programs.

In 1940 a Master of Fine Arts program was established.

In the 1980s, the college began renting various locations in San Francisco, and in 1996 it opened a campus in the city's Design District, converting a former Greyhound maintenance building.

In 2003 the college changed its name to California College of the Arts.

In 2016 it was decided to close the Oakland campus and consolidate all activities at the San Francisco campus. The final day of classes at Oakland was May 6, 2022. The college said it will "redevelop the campus with community gathering spaces, affordable housing, office space for arts nonprofits and bike parking while preserving the campus’s cluster of historic buildings and trees."

Academics

CCA offers 22 undergraduate and 13 graduate majors. In 2021, CCA unveiled a BFA in Comics. CCA confers the bachelor of fine arts (BFA), bachelor of arts (BA), bachelor of architecture (BArch), master of fine arts (MFA), master of arts (MA), master of architecture (MArch), master of advanced architectural design (MAAD), masters of design (MDes) and master of business administration (MBA) degrees.

The CCA Wattis Institute for Contemporary Arts, located near the San Francisco campus in a facility on Kansas St., is a forum for contemporary culture. In 2013 the Wattis Institute recruited a new director, Anthony Huberman, formerly of Artist's Space in New York.

In the U.S. News & World Report rankings for 2020, CCA ranked #10 in the country for graduate fine arts programs, #4 in graphic design, and #6 in ceramics.  PayScale lists CCA as the #1 art school in the United States for return on investment and #4 for average alumni salary (bachelor's degree). As of 2022, Niche rated CCA with an overall grade of B- (with B- for academics, A+ for diversity, and B- for value), reporting an acceptance rate of 85%, graduation rate of 67%, and average alumni starting salary of $29,400. The averages class size is 13 for undergraduate programs and 12 for graduate. The student to faculty ratio is 8:1.

Alumni

Noted alumni include the artists (listed in alphabetical order, by last name);

Academia 
Sonia Landy Sheridan (MFA 1961), professor emeritus at the School of the Art Institute of Chicago (SAIC)
 Hulleah Tsinhnahjinnie (BFA 1981 Painting and minor in Photography), educator at UC Davis

Artists

Ceramics 
 Robert Arneson (MFA 1958)
 Viola Frey (BFA 1956)
 Manuel Neri (Ceramics, attended in the 1950s)
 Peter Voulkos (MFA Ceramics 1950s)

Film 
 Ako Castuera (BFA 2000 Illustration), best known for storyboard art on Adventure Time
 Hong Sang-soo 
 Audrey Marrs (MA 2008, Curatorial Practice), Oscar-winning filmmaker and co-founder of Ladyfest
 Wayne Wang (attended in the mid 1970s), film director

Painting 
 Natalia Anciso (MFA 2011 Painting/Drawing)
 Robert Bechtle (BFA 1954, MFA 1958), painter
Clifford Beck (1968), painter
 Henrietta Berk (attended 1955–1959), painter
 Val Britton (MFA 2006)
 David Bierk (MFA c.1970)
 Squeak Carnwath (MFA 1977)
 Geoffrey Chadsey (MFA 1995)
 Jules de Balincourt (BFA 1998)
 George Albert Harris (Professor of Art, 1946–47)
 Warren Leopold
 Jake Longstreth (MFA 2005)
 Louis Macouillard (BFA 1943)
 Richard McLean (BFA Painting)
 George Miyasaki (BFA 1957, BAEd 1957, MFA 1958)
 Robert S. Neuman (MFA 1951 Painting)
 Toyin Odutola (MFA 2012)
 Nathan Oliveira (BFA 1951, MFA 1952)
 Suzanne Scheuer
M. Louise Stanley (BFA, 1967, MFA, 1969)
 Don Stivers (Painting, attended in the 1940s), military painter
 James Torlakson (BFA 1973)
 Lee Weiss (attended 1946-47) watercolorist

Photography 
 Beatrice Helg Swiss photographer
 Todd Hido (MFA 1996)
Jim Ricks (BFA 2002 Photo)
 Hank Willis Thomas (MFA 2004 Photo/MA Visual Criticism)
Hulleah Tsinhnahjinnie (BFA 1981)

Printmaking 
 Margo Humphrey (BFA Printmaking)
 Jesus Barraza (MFA 2016 Social Practice/MA Visual Criticism)
 Liliana Gramberg, printmaker and painter
 Roland Petersen (attended 1952-1954), painter and printmaker

Illustration 
 Sean Aaberg
 Trinidad Escobar
 Tomie de Paola (MFA 1969 Illustration)
 Chelsea Martin (Individualized Major 2008)
 Mike Mignola
Jenny Parks (MFA)

Mixed media 
 Harrell Fletcher (MFA 1994,) social practice
 Bryan Nash Gill (MFA 1988), sculpture
 Ana Maria Hernando (BFA 1990), installation art
 David Ireland (BFA ID 1953)
 (1930's) artist, blacksmith, metalsmith, founding member of the California Blacksmith Association (CBA)
 Dennis Oppenheim
 Raymond Saunders (MFA 1961)
 Richard Waters, inventor of the waterphone
 Susan O'Malley (MFA 2006 Social Practice) artist, public art, curator and author
Hsiung-Zee Wong, multimedia composer

Sculpture and Glass 
 Kate Ali (BFA 2007), sculpture
 Nicole Chesney, metalsmithing and glass
 Viola Frey (BFA 1956)
 Bryan Nash Gill (MFA 1988), sculpture
 Bob Haozous (BFA 1971 Sculpture)
 Dorothy Rieber Joralemon (1930s)
 Jerome Ranft (BFA 1991), sculpture
 Adrien Segal (BFA 2007 Furniture Design), sculpture designed with data

Designers 
 Erik Adigard (BFA 1987 Graphic Design)
Agnes Chavez (BFA 1984) entrepreneur, designing and creating educational tools.
 Roger C. Field (BFA 1968 Industrial Design)
 Florence Resnikoff (BFA 1967 Jewelry)
 Kay Sekimachi (BFA 1946-1949 Textiles)
 Michael Vanderbyl (BFA 1968)
 Dan Stiles, graphic designer

Writers 
 Kate Colby (MFA Writing)
 Joseph del Pesco (MA 2005 in Curatorial Practice), curator and arts writer
 Tessa Rumsey (MA 2002 in Visual and Critical Studies), poet
 Amy Schwartz (BFA 1976 in Drawing), children's book author and illustrator
 Maximilian Uriarte (BFA 2013 cum laude)

Faculty 
Listed noted faculty both past and present, in alphabetical order by department and last name.

Curators 
 Renny Pritikin 
 Jens Hoffmann – director of the CCA Wattis Institute from 2007–2012.

Designers 
 Yves Béhar – head of the Industrial Design Department from 2005–2012.
 Brenda Laurel – professor and chair of graduate design program. 
 Christopher Simmons
 Florence Resnikoff – professor of Jewelry and metal arts from 1973–1980.
 Lucille Tenazas 
 Michael Vanderbyl - faculty from 1973–2014, and Dean of Design from 1986–2002
 Sandra Vivanco - Professor in the CCA Architecture Division and Critical Ethnic Studies Program

Film 
 Rob Epstein
 Kota Ezawa (associate professor of film and fine arts)
Jeanne Finley
 Lynn Marie Kirby (graduate and undergraduate fine arts, film and interdisciplinary studies)

Painting and Fine Arts 
 Kim Anno
 Richard Diebenkorn
 Albert Dolmans
Josh Faught
 George Albert Harris (Professor of Art, 1946–47)
Linda Geary (Painting program, 2006–present)
 David Huffman (undergraduate painting and drawing)
 Xavier Martínez (painting and drawing from 1908–1943)
Alicia McCarthy
 Frederick E. Olmsted
Arthur Okamura
 Carole Doyle Peel
 Maria Porges (graduate fine arts)
 Raymond Saunders (former professor of painting)
 Elizabeth Sher
Mary Snowden
 Taravat Talepasand (adjunct painting professor)
Franklin Williams
 John Zurier

Photography 
 Tammy Rae Carland (dean of fine arts and professor)  
 Jim Goldberg (photography professor from 1987-2014)
 Larry Sultan (photography professor from 1989-2009)
 Susan Ciriclio (photography professor from 1988-2017)

Printmaking 
 Nance O'Banion (printmaking program Professor Emeritus, taught from 1974-2016)

Sculpture and Glass 
 Bella Feldman
 Linda Fleming  
 Viola Frey (ceramics teacher from 1965-1999) 
 Marvin Lipofsky (founder of the glass department)
Nancy Selvin

Social Practice 
 Ted Purves (chair of Social Practice graduate program)

Textiles 
 Lia Cook (textile design)
 Trude Guermonprez (chair of the Crafts Department)
Tracy Krumm

Writers 
 Opal Palmer Adisa 
 Dodie Bellamy 
 Bill Berkson 
 Tom Barbash
 Jasmin Darznik
 Sarah Webster Fabio
 Gloria Frym  
 Kevin Killian
 Michael McClure 
 Aimee Phan 
 Lisa Robertson 
 Mitchell Schwarzer
Two school faculty,  and  established Berkeley's first art pottery company California Faience.

Accreditation 
CCA is accredited by the Western Association of Schools and Colleges (WASC), the National Association of Schools of Art and Design (NASAD), and the National Architectural Accrediting Board (NAAB).

References

External links

 Official website

 
Art schools in California
Universities and colleges in Alameda County, California
Architecture schools in California
Design schools in the United States
Film schools in California
Education in Oakland, California
Potrero Hill, San Francisco
Educational institutions established in 1907
1907 establishments in California
Schools accredited by the Western Association of Schools and Colleges
Arts and Crafts movement
Art in the San Francisco Bay Area
Private universities and colleges in California